South Bermondsey is a ward in the London Borough of Southwark created in 2010 out of Burgess Ward in southeast London, England.

The area is served by South Bermondsey railway station, with a future station at Surrey Canal Road. Nearby neighborhoods include New Cross, Bermondsey, Deptford, Rotherhithe and Peckham.

It is the current home of Millwall F.C.

References

Areas of London
Districts of the London Borough of Southwark